The 1924 Nebraska gubernatorial election was held on November 4, 1924, and featured former state Senator Adam McMullen, a Republican, defeating Democratic nominee, former state Representative John N. Norton, and Progressive nominee, Omaha City Commissioner Dan B. Butler.

Incumbent Governor Charles W. Bryan, initially the nominee of both the Democratic and Progressive parties, withdrew from the race after being nominated for Vice President of the United States at the 1924 Democratic National Convention on July 9.

Democratic primary

Candidates
Charles W. Bryan, incumbent Governor
Charles Graff, former member of the Nebraska Legislature and president of the state Board of Agriculture

Results

Replacement nominee
Following Bryan's withdraw from the race, the Democratic State Central Committee met in Lincoln to choose a replacement on July 24. Among others, candidates considered for the nomination included Omaha City Commissioner John H. Hopkins, former state Representative John N. Norton of Polk, Morrill County Attorney Kenneth M. McDonald of Bridgeport, and former U.S. Representative Dan V. Stephens of Fremont. Norton was chosen on the seventeenth ballot after Hopkins and Stephens each withdrew their names, and besting McDonald with the necessary two-thirds of the vote.

Progressive primary

Candidates
Charles W. Bryan, incumbent Governor
Edward Sughroue

Results

Replacement nominee
Omaha City Commissioner Dan B. Butler, a Democrat and supporter of Senator Robert M. La Follette in the 1924 presidential election, was chosen by the three member Progressive Party State Executive Committee.

Prohibition primary

Candidates
Charles W. Bryan, incumbent Governor

Results

Republican primary

Candidates
C. H. Gustafson, former president of the United States Grain Growers Association
Albert N. Mathers, state Representative and former Mayor of Gering
Adam McMullen, former state Senator and Mayor of Wymore
George W. Sterling
W. F. Stoecker

Results

General election

Results

References

Gubernatorial
1924
Nebraska